United Nations Security Council Resolution 183, adopted on December 11, 1963, after the Secretary-General established a failed meeting between representatives of Portugal and those of African States, the Council again deprecated Portugal's failure to free its colonies though they said they would take Portugal's granting amnesty to all political prisoners as a sign of good faith.

The resolution was adopted with 10 votes and one abstention from France.

See also
List of United Nations Security Council Resolutions 101 to 200 (1953–1965)
Portuguese Empire
Portuguese Colonial War

References
Text of the Resolution at undocs.org

External links
 

 0183
1963 in Portugal
 0183
 0183
 0183
 0183
 0183
Portuguese Angola
Portuguese Mozambique
Portuguese Colonial War
Portuguese Guinea
Portuguese Cape Verde
1963 in Angola
1963 in Portuguese Guinea
1963 in Cape Verde
1963 in Mozambique
December 1963 events